Phaeophilaceae are a family of green algae in the order Ulvales.

References

External links

Ulvales
Ulvophyceae families